Harold Minter (March 5, 1903 – May 13, 2001) was an American film editor. He worked for the Hollywood studio Republic Pictures for a number of years.

Selected filmography
 Daughter of Don Q (1946)
 Train to Alcatraz (1948)
 Trial Without Jury (1950)
 Belle of Old Mexico (1950)
 Tropical Heat Wave (1952)
 Down Laredo Way (1953)
 Phantom Stallion (1954)

References

Bibliography
 Robert W. Phillips. Roy Rogers: A Biography. McFarland, 1995.

External links

1903 births
2001 deaths
American film editors